Saharan rock art is a significant area of archaeological study focusing on artwork carved or painted on the natural rocks of the central Sahara desert. The rock art dates from numerous periods starting  years ago, and is significant because it shows the culture of ancient African societies.

The paintings and carvings of the Sahara are endangered, and vulnerable rock art on uncovered rock has already disappeared. Organizations, such as the Trust for African Rock Art, are researching and recording as much information about Saharan rock art as possible, while raising awareness of threats to the art itself.

Archaeological sites
Important regions and sites include:
Cave of Swimmers and Cave of Beasts caves area, Gilf Kebir area, Egypt
Tibesti, Chad: Also known as Tibesti Massif or Tibesti Mountains located in central Sahara, extending from Niger and Libya. The rock art that exists in these mountains was created before dramatic climate change in the Saharan Desert caused the inhabitants to move towards the Nile Valley. Large animal engravings and other rock art dates to between 12,000 and 4,000 years ago.
Ennedi, Chad: Next to the Tibesti Mountain chain is another mountain chain named Ennedi. Much of the rock art in this area is from the Horse Period, and was made in the last 2,000 years. Pastoral Period art was also shown here.
Messak Settafet, Libya: Abundant rock art is found in this location, near a mountain chain in Libya. Art is made from engraving techniques such as grinding, pecking, and scratching. Outlines of animals are found in blackened sandstone.

Tadrart Acacus, Libya: Near the sand dune of Murzuk, bordering Tassili n'Ajjer, exists 12,000 year old prehistoric rock art. It appears to reflect much of the same culture as the Tassili n'Ajjer rock art.

Tassili n'Ajjer, Algeria: The cave paintings found at Tassili n'Ajjer, north of Tamanrasset, Algeria, and at other locations depict vivid scenes of everyday life in central North Africa between about 10,000 BP and 6,000 BP, in the Later Stone Age. There are over 15,000 individual pieces of artwork in Tassili n'Ajjer. The art includes paintings and engravings into the rock that depicts the culture of Africans up to 12,000 years ago. They were executed by a hunting people in the Capsian period between 5,000 and 3,900 BP who lived in a savanna region teeming with giant buffalo, elephant, rhinoceros, and hippopotamus, animals that no longer exist in the now-desert area. The site was founded by French anthropologist Henri Lhote 50 years ago, yet researchers are still discovering new artwork.
South Oran, Algeria
Djelfa, Algeria
Ahaggar, Algeria
Draa River, Morocco
Rock art of Figuig, Morocco
Aïr Mountains, Niger
Sabu-Jaddi rock art site in Northern Sudan

Research techniques 
Archaeologists, anthropologists, and other researchers have been studying rock art to gain information about African cultures from the past. Many photographs are taken of the art so it can be studied further. Dating the art of the Sahara is made possible through radiometric dating of organic material, including radiocarbon dating. Organic artifacts found at the sites can be dated, as can some residues on the rock art itself.

Rock art time periods

Large Wild Fauna Period (12,000 BP - 6000 BP): Saharan hunter-gatherer societies first made rock art. These images included animals that then lived in the area, including hippos, rhinos, elephants, giraffes, bubalus, aurochs, and large antelopes. Many of those animals no longer exist in the Sahara due to changes in climate that have caused the desiccation of the desert over the past several thousand years. Humans are shown hunting with spears and axes. The artwork portrays not only hunting, but the relationship between humans and animals. Most of the artwork can be found in Tassili n'Ajjer, Algeria.
Kel Essuf Period (9800 BP): The Kel Essuf rock art tradition of engraving may have developed into the Round Head rock art tradition of painting.
Round Head Period (9500 BP - 7000 BP): Hunter-gatherers on the Tassili Plateau painted distinctive human figures with round, featureless heads. 
Pastoral Period (7200 BP - 3000 BP): During this period, humans were depicted with domesticated cattle. Pictures show cultures herding animals and hunting as well, portrayed through men holding bows. Women and children are in camps where they lived. This style is shown around the Sahara with paintings and engravings. Herders eventually migrated to the west, east, and south as Saharan climates aridified.
Horse Period (3200 BP - 1000 BP): Humans are shown with horses during this period. Paintings and few engravings have men on horses with weapons, as well as horse-drawn chariots. The people are also dressed in clothing instead of no clothing at all.
Camel Period (3000 BP - 2000 BP): This is the final period of rock art in the Sahara, with images of camels appearing. Cattle and goats are frequently included in Camel Period art as well. Advanced weaponry is depicted, including pictures of men with spears, swords, and shields.

See also 
Rock art
Prehistoric art
List of Stone Age art
Association des Amis de l'Art Rupestre Saharien
African humid period

References

 
10th millennium BC